The Harvard Crimson women's volleyball team represents Harvard University in National Collegiate Athletic Association (NCAA) Division I women's volleyball. Harvard competes as a member of the Ivy League and plays its home games at the Malkin Athletic Center (MAC) in Cambridge, Massachusetts.

History
Harvard's first team took the court in 1981. The Crimson has won the Ivy League championship once in 2004.

Players

Current roster

See also
 Harvard Crimson men's volleyball
 Harvard Crimson
 List of NCAA Division I women's volleyball programs

References

External links
 

 
1981 establishments in Massachusetts